The Birch Gun was the first practical British self-propelled artillery gun, built at the Royal Arsenal, Woolwich in 1925.

Despite proving itself a practical proposition the Birch Gun was never highly regarded by the British High Command, not for any particular defect or capability issue, but due to the belief that such an innovation was unrequired, expensive and unnecessary. Named after General Sir Noel Birch, who was Master General of Ordnance at the time, the Birch gun comprised a Vickers Medium Mark II tank chassis originally fitted with a QF 18-pounder (83.8 mm) gun. This remained the armament in all the models, although the latest version, generally called the Mk III, had limited elevation. Birch Guns were used in the Experimental Mechanized Force manoeuvres of 1928, but by 1931 they had been removed from service and political pressure was applied to prevent any plans to complete the third revision of the weapon.

Armament
The armament for the original Birch Gun consisted of an Ordnance QF 18 pounder field gun (3.3 inch, 84 mm). The mounting and sighting arrangements varied in the various versions but the gun remained the same.

Powerplant
The Armstrong Siddeley engine was only moderately powerful by later standards, an 8-cylinder 90 horse power unit which gave a maximum speed of 28 mph/45 km/h, however, by comparison with tracked armour of the era – the Medium Mark A Whippet 'cavalry tank' of World War I was twenty miles per hour slower – it was considered more than adequate and had twice the Whippet's range.

Use
The Birch gun was tested as part of the Experimental Mechanized Force in the 1920s. The Force undertook various experiments in mechanized warfare combining tanks and infantry with their own motorised transport.

The composition of the force was:
 reconnaissance group with tankettes and armoured cars
 battalion of 48 Vickers medium tanks
 motorised machine gun battalion
 mechanised artillery regiment, Birch guns forming one battery
 motorised field engineer company

References

Bibliography

External links
 Self-Propelled Field and Medium Guns

Self-propelled artillery of the United Kingdom
85 mm artillery
Abandoned military projects of the United Kingdom